Frank Little may refer to:

Frank Little (unionist) (1879–1917), American IWW labor leader
Sir Frank Little (bishop) (1925–2008), Australian Roman Catholic archbishop
Frank Little (tenor) (1939–2006), operatic tenor
Frank Little, one of The Littles, fictional characters from the series of children's novels by John Peterson
Frank Little (sport shooter) (1936–1993), American Olympic shooter

See also
Francis Little (disambiguation)